Lynda Chuba-Ikpeazu, also known as Lynda Chuba (born 22 June 1966), is a Nigerian politician who gained popularity as the first ever MBGN winner in 1986. She is the  daughter of former Chief Justice and two-time NFA chairman Chuba Ikpeazu. She is also one of 11 female out of the 360 lawmakers at the chamber in Nigeria.

Early life and education 
Chuba-Ikpeazu was educated in Nigeria, England, and in America, where she modelled part-time. She holds a bachelor's degree in communication, a master's degree in business administration, and another bachelor's degree in law.

Pageants 
In 1986 whilst on vacation, Chuba-Ikpeazu emerged winner of the first Most Beautiful Girl in Nigeria, thus starting the domination of Igbo women in the pageant. In 1987 she was the first Nigerian representative at Miss Universe since Edna Park in 1964, but her biggest pageantry achievement occurred when she was crowned Miss Africa the same year.

After her reign, Chuba-Ikpeazu became a businesswoman in Lagos, specialising in oil servicing.

Political career 
Chuba-Ikpeazu was a member of the House of Representatives from 1999 to 2003. In 2004, Chuba-Ikpeazu became the winner of the Nigerian National Assembly election, representing Onitsha North-South Federal Constituency as a candidate of the People's Democratic Party (PDP). Lynda is the Chair, House Committee on Maritime Safety and Education.

She is currently a member of the Board of Directors of Anambra United.

References

External links
Lynda Chuba-Ikpeazu
 Lynda and Miss Africa

1966 births
Igbo beauty pageant contestants
Living people
Members of the House of Representatives (Nigeria)
Miss Universe 1987 contestants
Most Beautiful Girl in Nigeria winners
20th-century Nigerian women politicians
Peoples Democratic Party members of the House of Representatives (Nigeria)
21st-century Nigerian women politicians
21st-century Nigerian politicians
Most Beautiful Girl in Nigeria contestants